(The Lover), Op. 14, is a suite by Jean Sibelius. He completed it in 1912, scored for string orchestra, percussion and triangle. He based it on his earlier composition of the same title, a song cycle of four movements for men's chorus a cappella completed in 1894. The works are based on a Finnish text in Book 1 of the Kanteletar.

History 
In 1894, Sibelius completed , a cycle of four a cappella songs for men's chorus on a Finnish text in Book 1 of the collection of Finnish folk poems, the Kanteletar. He first set it in 1894, as an entry for a local competition. He won the second prize, while the first prize went to his former teacher. Sibelius arranged the cycle for men's chorus and string orchestra in 1894, and for mixed choir in 1898.

Sibelius used the cycle as the basis for the orchestral suite  for string orchestra, percussion and triangle, to which he assigned the opus number 14. He completed it in 1912, when he also wrote his Fourth Symphony. Sibelius often conducted the suite together with his symphonies because the piece "captivated audiences".

Music

Structure of the song cycle

Structure of the suite 

 , Andante con moto (common time, D minor)
  (The way of the lover), Allegretto (B major)
  (Good night, farewell), Andantino (cut time, F major & D minor)

In the first movement, the strings sound light and beautiful. The choral part of the second movement was changed to "murmurs on the strings and wonderfully flexible melodic progressions." The third movement is deeply emotional as its model.

Recordings 
The orchestral work was recorded along with other music by Sibelius, including Snöfrid, the Cantata for the Coronation of Nicholas II, Oma maa (My country) and Andante Festivo. On volume 54 of a complete Sibelius Edition by BIS, Osmo Vänskä conducts the Lahti Symphony Orchestra. A review notes the works "ethereal polyphony" and compares it to the melancholy of the Sixth Symphony. The work was also recorded by Neville Marriner and the Academy of St Martin in the Fields.

Literature 
 Tomi Mäkelä: "Jean Sibelius und seine Zeit" (German), Laaber-Verlag, Regensburg 2013

References

External links 
 

Choral compositions
Compositions for string orchestra
Suites by Jean Sibelius
1894 compositions
1912 compositions